WQTM (1480 AM) is a radio station licensed to serve Fair Bluff, in the U.S. state of North Carolina. The station, founded in 1967 as WWKO, is currently owned by Keith Baldwin.

WQTM has been silent since September 15, 2018 due to damage from Hurricane Florence, but had most recently broadcast a Sports talk format.

The station was reassigned its legacy WWKO call letters by the Federal Communications Commission on January 29, 2009. The station changed call sign to WQTM and returned to the air as a simulcast of WEVG in Evergreen, Alabama effective July 12, 2011.

The simulcast with WEVG ended due to then-station owners Rama Communications not paying for services rendered by WEVG. Effective July 9, 2019, Rama Communications sold WQTM and the construction permit for translator W279DQ to Keith Baldwin for $10.

References

External links

QTM